State Road 30A (SR 30A) is a Florida Department of Transportation designation shared by four alternate routings of SR 30 in the Florida panhandle. Two segments have SR 30A signage; the other two do not as they are segments of U.S. Route 98 (US 98). Three of the four SR 30A segments are next to the shore of the Gulf of Mexico for most (if not all) of their length.

CR 30A: Point Washington State Forest segment
Just west of Santa Rosa Beach, near East Hewett Road, CR 30A branches off Reddick Road (US 98/SR 30) and heads southeastward toward the shore of the Gulf of Mexico. While US 98/SR 30 continues through the heart of Point Washington State Forest, CR 30A follows the shoreline, passing through Grayton Beach and Seaside, before rejoining SR 30 near Inlet Beach.

While US 98/SR 30 spans the length of Point Washington State Forest, CR 30A doesn't avoid it completely: the westernmost mile (1.6 km) forms the boundary between the state forest and Topsail Hill Preserve State Park. Continuing along the Gulf of Mexico, CR 30A cuts through approximately three miles (4.8 km) of state forest between Blue Mountain Beach and Seaside and another  of Deer Lake State Park to the southeast of Seagrove Beach.

SR 30A: Panama City Beach segment
The Panama City Beach Segment ends  from the western terminus, as traffic on US 98/SR 30A rejoins SR 30 on the approach to the Hathaway Bridge crossing St. Andrews Bay and entering Panama City.

SR 30A: US 98 through Panama City and Callaway
On the eastern approach to the Hathaway Bridge, SR 30 and US 98 separate at the corner of 18th Street and Beck Avenue in Panama City. US 98 and SR 30A continues eastward along 15th Street, passing through Cedar Grove and Springfield before a southward 90-degree turn onto North Tyndall Parkway in Callaway. As US 98/SR 30A approach the New DuPont Bridge across East Bay, its  run ends with the merge with Business US 98/SR 30 near Long Point.

US 98 Business and SR 30 in Panama City and Callaway
While US 98/SR 30A follows 15th Street through Panama City and Callaway before reaching North Tyndall Parkway, US 98 Business and SR 30 follows Ninth Street, Beach Dr, Sixth Street, and Fifth Street before curving southward (near School Avenue) and eastward (through Parker before rejoining US 98 on the approach to the New Dupont Bridge. The merge marks the eastern terminus of the  US 98 Business.

Former and current SR 30A: a loop near Port St. Joe
After FDOT started phasing out a set of Florida State Roads in the late 1970s and early 1980s and reverted them to county maintenance, many State Roads disappeared from road maps, and many others were greatly truncated or transformed. One such drastically-affected road was SR 30A, which formed a  loop in Gulf and Franklin counties.

Today, only the north–south section is still signed SR 30A. The east–west stretch is now County Road 30A.

See also

References

External links
 Scenic Highway 30A (Florida Scenic Highways)
 30A.com
 Discover 30-A

030A
030A
030A
030A
030A
030A